Sarge is an arcade game released by Bally Midway in 1985. Two players play at once, switching between tanks and helicopters. Players can fight each other. The game has two sets of joysticks.

References

External links
 

1985 video games
Arcade video games
Arcade-only video games
Head-to-head arcade video games
Helicopter video games
Midway video games
Military combat simulators
North America-exclusive video games
Tank simulation video games
Video games developed in the United States